Baba Hajji (also Romanized as Bābā Ḩājjī) is a village in Zeydabad Rural District, in the Central District of Sirjan County, Kerman Province, Iran. At the 2006 census, its population was 35, in 8 families.

References 

Populated places in Sirjan County